Mirificarma denotata is a moth of the family Gelechiidae. It is found in Morocco, Portugal and Spain.

The wingspan is 7.5-8.5 mm for males and 7–8 mm for females. The head is light or occasionally mid-brown. The forewings are mottled brown and light pink-grey, with an ochreous tinge near the base. Adults have been recorded from late April to May.

The larvae feed on Astragalus lusitanicus.

References

Moths described in 1984
Mirificarma
Moths of Europe
Moths of Africa